Meadhaven United is a Jamaican football team which played in the top flight Jamaica National Premier League, in the 2008/2009 season.

It is based in the Meadowbrook district of Kingston, Jamaica, but need to play their home matches at Constant Spring due to a lack of stands at their Michigan Oval home ground.

History
The club was founded in March 1977 by a group of 15-year-old youngsters from the Meadowbrook and Havendale community. Led by Michael Dyche, Christopher Hunt, George Ballin and Gary Steadman they approached University of the West Indies Student David Hunt to be their coach and he agreed. Playing under the name Meadowbrook United they participated in the President's Cup a qualifying competition for the under 17 Minor League. The team subsequently won their zone and thus qualified for the Minor League the following year.

From this initial success senior footballers were spurred into action and a clubs called Spectrum and Hal-Haven were formed between in late 1977 and early 1978. Hal-Haven coached by David Hunt won the S.D.C Under 19 competition and Spectrum coached by Arthur Clarke won the over 19 competitions. In March 1978 the teams pooled resources and formed the Meadowbrook and Havendale Sports Association and competed under the new name Meadhaven United. The club over the years has produced several national team players at both the junior and senior levels.

They won promotion to the top level in summer 2008 when they won the NPL play-off series ahead of fellow qualifiers, Rivoli United F.C. During this successful season, in October 2007, founding member, former president and technical director David Hunt died of an apparent heart-attack.

Meadhaven had trouble in attracting sponsorship ahead of their first NPL season. They only lasted one season at the top level, they got relegated after the season's play-offs.

Achievements
1979 : KSAFA MinorLeague Competition – Third place & Most Disciplined Team
1982 : Florida Competition First place U12 & Under 14 teams
1982/83 : KSAFA Major League Most Improved Team
1983 : Florida Competition 2nd Place Under 16 Team
1984 : 3rd Pl Minor League and 1st Minor League Knockout Competition
1986 : 3rd Minor League and 2nd Minor League Knockout
1987 : 3rd Minor League Competition
2008 : KSAFA Super League Champions/Promoted to Digicel Premier League

External links
 Team profile – Golocaljamaica

References

Football clubs in Jamaica
Association football clubs established in 1977
1977 establishments in Jamaica